"Vossi Bop" is a song by British rapper Stormzy. It was released as a single on 25 April 2019 through #Merky and Atlantic Records as the lead single from his second studio album, Heavy Is the Head. The music video was also released the same day. It is his first solo music since his Gang Signs & Prayer album in 2017. The song debuted atop the UK Singles Chart, becoming Stormzy's first number-one single.

Background
The song is Stormzy's first new music as a lead artist since 2017, when he released his UK number-one album Gang Signs & Prayer. During his time away, he pursued interests outside of music. Upon the song's release, Stormzy corrected several users on Twitter who had written the first line as "My bruddas don't die, we just Vossi bop", stressing that it was "dab" and not "die".

Music video
The music video was directed by Henry Scholfield and released on 25 April 2019. It features Stormzy rapping on Westminster Bridge and outside the Bank of England.

Remixes
Four remixes of the song were released on 19 July 2019. Respectively, they featured Norwegian artist Lauren, Italian rapper Ghali, Swedish duo Aden x Asme, and German rappers Bausa and Capo.

Commercial performance
On the midweek UK Singles Chart, Stormzy was at number one, ahead of "Me!" by Taylor Swift featuring Brendon Urie by some 500 combined sales. Several media outlets, including the BBC and Noisey, made note that it could be Stormzy's first UK number-one single. The song debuted at number one on the official chart ahead of previous number one, "Old Town Road" by Lil Nas X, and Swift's "Me!" at numbers two and three, respectively. "Vossi Bop" also received 12.7 million streams in its debut week on sale, the highest ever by a rapper and the fifth-highest of all time.

Charts

Weekly charts

Year-end charts

Certifications

References

2019 singles
2019 songs
Stormzy songs
UK Singles Chart number-one singles
Songs written by Stormzy